Jan Ruhtenberg (a.k.a. Alexander Gustaf Jan Ruhtenberg or Alexander Gustav Jan Ruhtenberg, born Alexander Gustaf Rutencrantz von Ruhtenberg, 28 February 1896 – died, December 1975) was an architect who "made significant contributions in introducing modern architecture to the United States as a teacher and a modern architect".

Ruhtenberg was involved in the Bauhaus movement in Germany, studying under Mies van der Rohe and worked with Philip Johnson.  In The International Style: Architecture Since 1922 Johnson acknowledges Ruhtenberg as one of two “kind friends” who have read and criticized draft texts.  Johnson and fellow author Henry-Russell Hitchcock included Ruhtenberg’s 1930 Berlin apartment house interior among their illustrations of modern design.  In his biography of Philip Johnson, architectural historian Franz Schulze refers to Ruhtenberg as Johnson's new friend during the latter's travels in Germany in 1929.  The two visited the Bauhaus in Dessau together.  At the time Ruhtenberg was a public relations aide to designer Bruno Paul.  Johnson, working with Henry-Russell Hitchcock, was gathering material for The International Style: Architecture Since 1922.  Ruhtenberg was traveling with them.  Schulze cites Johnson's letter of 17 September 1930 to J. J. P. Oud, a Dutch modernist architect, in which Johnson called Ruhtenberg his best friend, describing him as a beginning architecture student.  Three years later in another letter to Oud, Johnson tells him that he is building a house in Manhattan with his friend Jan Ruhtenberg.   He was active in many areas of country such as New York City with both his architectural skills (the renovation of 57 East 93rd Street that was reviewed by Architectural Forum in 1937); He is "credited" with the interior design of Nelson Rockefeller's Penthouse at 810 Fifth Avenue (62nd Street) by the New York Times; and his opinions on the progressive housing movement which were recorded for the Library of Congress.  
  He was a professor at Columbia University in New York City, where he was hired to teach the "new architecture" in 1934 by Joseph Hudnut.  He married Polly King Ruhtenberg on August 4, 1935 in New York City.

Examples of his work
Ruhtenberg’s work can still be seen in Colorado Springs, Colorado, where he was active during the 1940s and 1950s. Julie Penrose hired the architect to design the now destroyed El Pomar Carriage House Museum at The Broadmoor resort in 1939 to house the collection of her late husband, Spencer Penrose.  While Ruhtenberg was active elsewhere in the country, he maintained a house in Colorado Springs and continued to receive national press for his works in Colorado.  He was also a member of the Central City Opera House's board of directors from 1947 to 1951, and contributed to rebuilding the opera house and some of the adjacent homes owned by the Central City Opera, which now are used as housing for cast and crew.

One of Ruhtenberg’s designs exists in its original form at 55 Marland Road in Colorado Springs.  Designed for Hugo C. Fischer in 1949, the house was featured in the February 1954 edition of Progressive Architecture. Progressive architecture award It is steel framed, with insulated pumice block walls and a lightweight concrete roof.  Inside, the pressed sugar-cane roof insulation is exposed, with the rough texture of the pressed sugar-cane complementing the rough pumice stone.  A large fresco of Orpheus and Euridyce [ by ] occupies the Southern wall, which Ruhtenberg apparently added in a flash of inspiration while the building was under construction. The fresco was painted by Edgar Britton, described as "One of Colorado's very important artists of the 20th century".

Elaine Freed of Colorado College has been photographing Ruhtenberg’s buildings in order to preserve their legacy, working with the Jackson Fellowships which are associated with the Hulbert Center for Southwest Studies at Colorado College.  Elaine published MODERN AT MIDCENTURY: Ruhtenberg Revisited in 2017, which documents 5 Ruhtenberg designed houses in Colorado Springs. Additional photos of Ruhtenberg's work are located at Pikes Peak Library District's website which are gifts from Guy Burgess.

Jan Ruhtenberg is listed as the decorator-designer of the Living Room - Fireplace Group of the Town of Tomorrow House #10 (House of Vistas) in the 1939 New York World's Fair.  The coffee table strongly resembles the Barcelona Coffee Table generally attributed to the collaborative work of Mies van der Rohe and Lilly Reich.  The Barcelona Table was originally named the 'Dessau Table' and the 'Tugendhat Coffee Table' as it gained identity associated with its use in the Villa Tugendhat in Brno in 1930, part of groupings designed by Mies van der Rohe for that home; it is called the Barcelona Table because it was used in the German Pavilion for the Barcelona World's Fair in 1929. The side chairs here attributed to Ruhtenberg bear slight resemblance to the Mid-century modern Tobia Scarpa Bastiano Lounge Chair which received the 1969 West German Design Center Stuttgart Award.

Footnotes

External links
Museum exhibit at Indianapolis Museum of Contemporary Art (iMOCA) on Jan Ruhtenberg

20th-century American architects
Architects from Colorado
1896 births
1975 deaths
German emigrants to the United States